Belšinja Vas is a small village in the Municipality of Trebnje in eastern Slovenia. It lies on the right bank of the Temenica River west of Trebnje. The area is part of the traditional region of Lower Carniola. The municipality is now included in the Southeast Slovenia Statistical Region.

Name
Belšinja Vas was attested in historical documents as Velestoͤrf in 1383, Willissendorff in 1433, and Valschen in 1463, among other spellings.

References

External links
Belšinja Vas at Geopedia

Populated places in the Municipality of Trebnje